Staniša is a Serbian masculine given name, derived from Slavic root stan and suffix -iša. It was traditionally given as an apotropaic (protective) name, when children often died, or when many children were born. It has been used in Serbian society since the Middle Ages. It may refer to:

Staniša Mandić (born 1995), footballer
Staniša Radmanović (born 1940), sprint canoer
Staniša Radonjić (died ca. 1720), orthodox priest and military commander
Staniša Stošić (1945–2008), singer
Stanisha (son of Gjon Kastrioti), the brother of Skanderbeg

See also
Stanišić (disambiguation)

References

Sources
 

Slavic masculine given names
Serbian masculine given names